Bicine is an organic compound used as a buffering agent.  It is one of Good's buffers and has a pKa of 8.35 at 20 °C.  It is prepared by the reaction of glycine with ethylene oxide, followed by hydrolysis of the resultant lactone.

Bicine is a contaminant in amine systems used for gas sweetening. It is formed by amine degradation in the presence of O2, SO2, H2S or Thiosulfate.

See also
 Tricine

References

Buffer solutions
Hydroxy acids
Zwitterions
Acetic acids
Diols